Himachal Vikas Congress (Himalayan Development Congress), was a regional political party in Himachal Pradesh, India.

Formation 
Himachal Vikas Congress was formed when Sukh Ram and Anil Sharma split from the Indian National Congress after were expelled from the Congress party after the telecom scam. Anil Sharma was elected to the Rajya Sabha in 1998 as member of Himachal Vikas Congress. Himachal Vikas Congress, entered into a post-poll alliance with the Bharatiya Janata Party and joined the government.

They won the five seats in 1998 Himachal Pradesh Legislative Assembly election and won seat of Sukh Ram in 2003 Himachal Pradesh Legislative Assembly election. Lt. Col. Dhani Ram Shandil won from Shimla in 2004 Indian general election

Himachal Vikas Congress merged with the Congress Party in 2004.

Electoral results

1998 Himachal election

2003 Himachal election

2004 Indian general election

See also 
Indian National Congress breakaway parties

External links
A record of the party's victory in the constituency of Mandi at the 2003 Himachal Pradesh state elections

References

Indian National Congress breakaway groups
Political parties in Himachal Pradesh
Defunct political parties in Himachal Pradesh
Political parties established in 1998
1998 establishments in Himachal Pradesh
Political parties established in 2004
2004 disestablishments in India